The women's C-1 slalom canoeing event at the 2020 Summer Olympics took place on 28 and 29 July 2021 at the Kasai Canoe Slalom Course. 22 canoeists from 22 nations competed. The event was won by Jessica Fox from Australia, who already had three medals (one silver and two bronzes) in K-1 slalom from the 2012, 2016, and 2020 Olympics. Briton Mallory Franklin won silver, and German Andrea Herzog bronze. For both of them it was the first Olympic medal.

Background
This was the debut appearance of the event, replacing the men's C-2. Previously, there had been three men's events (C-1, C-2, and K-1) and only one women's event (K-1) in slalom canoeing at the Olympics; as of 2020, both men and women will have the C-1 and K-1 events.

Reigning World Champion Andrea Herzog earned a place for, and has been selected to compete by, Germany.

Qualification

A National Olympic Committee (NOC) could enter only 1 qualified canoeist in the women's slalom C-1 event. A total of 17 qualification places were available, allocated as follows:

 1 place for the host nation, Japan
 11 places awarded through the 2019 ICF Canoe Slalom World Championships
 5 places awarded through continental tournaments, 1 per continent

Five additional athletes will compete, having already earned a quota in the Women's K1 event.

Qualifying places were awarded to the NOC, not to the individual canoeist who earned the place.

The World Championships quota places were allocated as follows:

Continental and other places:

Notes
The quota for the Americas was allocated to the NOC with the highest-ranked eligible athlete, due to the cancellation of the 2021 Pan American Championships.
The Africa quota was initially reallocated to Hungary, but was further reallocated to Switzerland following the Hungarian Olympic Committee's decision to only send athletes vaccinated against COVID-19 to the Games, and Schmid's subsequent withdrawal.

Competition format
Slalom canoeing uses a three-round format, with heats, semifinal, and final. In the heats, each canoeist has two runs at the course with the better time counting. The top 15 advance to the semifinal. In the semifinal, the canoeists get a single run; the top 10 advance to the final. The best time in the single-run final wins gold.

The canoe course is approximately 250 metres long, with up to 25 gates that the canoeist must pass in the correct direction. Penalty time is added for infractions such as passing on the wrong side or touching a gate. Runs typically last approximately 95 seconds.

Schedule
All times are Japan Standard Time (UTC+9)

The women's slalom C-1 took place over two consecutive days.

Results

References

Women's slalom C-1
Women's events at the 2020 Summer Olympics